Calentao', sometimes spelled calenta'o  (Colombian Spanish creole folk slang for "heated," derived from the Standard Spanish word calentado) is a Paisa and Antioquia, Colombian cuisine dish made from reheated leftovers including rice, egg, pasta, beans, potatoes and other foods such as arepa, chorizo, and ground beef. It is generally eaten for breakfast and is often accompanied by aguapanela, arepa, coffee, juice or hot chocolate.  Depending on the region it can also be served with hogao. It is sometimes referred to as Fríjoles Trasnochaos. A fried egg is usually served on top of the dish and it is called Calentao' "A Caballo" . It is usually eaten for breakfast using some of the night before's leftovers.

See also
 Bandeja paisa
 Sancocho

References

Further reading
 How to cook a Calentado Wikihow

Colombian culture
Colombian cuisine
Egg dishes
Latin American rice dishes
Breakfast dishes